Adalberto "Bitto" Albertini (1924–1999) was an Italian film director and screenwriter.

Career

He began his film career as a camera operator and as a cinematographer. In 1974 Albertini directed Black Emanuelle starring the then almost unknown Laura Gemser. Her subsequent successful career meant that she was absent from Black Emanuelle 2, and Albertini instead cast actress Shulamith Lasri in the title role.

In 1977 he released Yellow Emanuelle as a comeback. The film, starring Chai Lee, was very successful. However the film never reached the popularity of Joe D'Amato's series. His last two films were "Mondos" set in Asia, depicting shocking rituals and savage violence.

He died in Italy in 1999 at age 74.

Selected filmography

 Feathers in the Wind (1950)
 That Ghost of My Husband (1950)
 Brief Rapture (1951)
 A Woman Has Killed (1952)
 Red Love (1952)
 Matrimonial Agency (1953)
 The Song of the Heart (1955)
 The Red Cloak (1955)
 Captain Falcon (1958)
 Toto's First Night (1962)
 Sandokan to the Rescue (1964)
 Sandokan Against the Leopard of Sarawak (1964)
 Goldface, the Fantastic Superman (1967)
  (1968)
 War Devils (1969)
  (1970)
 Human Cobras (1971)
 Metti lo diavolo tuo ne lo mio inferno (1972)
 Supermen Against the Orient (1973)
 Return of Shanghai Joe (1975)
 Black Emanuelle (1975)
 Black Emanuelle 2 (1976)
 Yellow Emanuelle (1977)
 Safari Rally (1978)
 Naked and Cruel (1984)

References

External links
Bitto Albertini, Internet Movie Database.

Italian film directors
20th-century Italian screenwriters
Giallo film directors
1924 births
1999 deaths
Film people from Turin
Italian male screenwriters
20th-century Italian male writers